Empress Yan (personal name unknown) was an empress of the Di-led Chinese Cheng Han dynasty. Her husband was Li Qi. He created her empress in 334 after he seized the throne following his brother Li Yue (李越)'s assassination of their father Li Xiong (Emperor Wu)'s designated heir, their cousin Li Ban (Emperor Ai). There was no further mentioning of her in historical records, and it is not known whether she was still alive at the time that Li Qi was overthrown by his father's cousin Li Shou (Emperor Zhaowen) in 338.

References 

Yan, Empress (Li Qi)
Year of birth unknown
Year of death unknown